The 1843 United States Senate election in New York was held on February 7, 1843, by the New York State Legislature to elect a U.S. Senator (Class 3) to represent the State of New York in the United States Senate.

Background
Silas Wright, Jr., had been elected in 1833 to this seat after the resignation of William L. Marcy, and had been re-elected in 1837. Wright's term would expire on March 3, 1843.

At the State election in November 1842, Democrat William C. Bouck was elected Governor, 92 Democrats and 36 Whigs were elected to the Assembly, and 8 Democrats and 1 Whig were elected to the State Senate. The 66th New York State Legislature met from January 3 to April 18, 1843, at Albany, New York.

Candidates
The incumbent U.S. Senator Silas Wright, Jr. was re-nominated unanimously by a Democratic caucus on the eve of the election.

Congressman Millard Fillmore was the candidate of the Whig Party.

Result
Silas Wright, Jr., was the choice of both the Assembly and the Senate, and was declared elected.

Aftermath
Wright continued in the U.S. Senate, and remained in office until November 1844 when he resigned after his election as Governor of New York. Henry A. Foster was appointed to fill the vacancy temporarily, but the State Legislature elected John A. Dix for the remainder of Wright's term.

Sources
The New York Civil List compiled in 1858 (see: pg. 63 for U.S. Senators; pg. 134 for State Senators 1843; pg. 227f for Members of Assembly 1843)
Members of the 28th United States Congress
Political History of the State of New York, from Jan. 1, 1841, to Jan. 1, 1847; Vol. III by Jabez Delano Hammond (State election, 1842: pg. 311f; U.S. Senate election, 1843: pg. 349)
Journal of the Assembly (66th Session) (1843; pg. 255f)

1843
United States Senate
New York